Dance in China is a highly varied art form, consisting of many modern and traditional dance genres.

Chinese dance may also refer to specific dances:
Lion dance
Dragon dance
Dunhuang dance
Errenzhuan
Yangge
Baishou Dance
Nuo opera, including Nuo dance
Chinese fitness dancing

See also 
 Sword dance